MV Salvador Allende was a cargo ship that sank in December 1994 in the North Atlantic Ocean with the loss of 29 of her 31 crew members.

Salvador Allende was built by the Warnowwerft shipyard of Warnemünde, in what was then East Germany. She was launched on 30 July 1973, and was delivered to Cuban owners. At the time of her loss, Salvador Allende was owned by the Black Sea Shipping Company of Ukraine.

In early December 1994, Salvador Allende was sailing eastbound from the American port of Freeport, Texas to Helsinki, Finland, with 31 crew on board and a cargo of rice when she encountered a severe storm. Late on 8 December, the crew made a distress call saying that the ship was taking on water and listing. The United States Coast Guard launched a rescue mission, aided by commercial vessels and military aircraft from both the US and Canada. During the day, at least three ships and a Canadian aircraft had located survivors in the water on lifeboats and floating debris, but due heavy seas and impending nightfall, the Coast Guard chose to wait until the following day to attempt to recover them.

Before dawn on 10 December, the cargo ship Torungen retrieved one survivor from Salvador Allende, the ship's second mate. The bodies of seven sailors were recovered by ships; the remaining 22 were not found.

References

Maritime incidents in 1994
1973 ships
Ships built in Rostock